Batticaloa (Maṭṭakkaḷappu; , Maḍakalapuwa) is a major city in the Eastern Province, Sri Lanka, and its former capital. It is the administrative capital of the Batticaloa District. The city is the seat of the Eastern University of Sri Lanka and is a major commercial centre.

Etymology 
Batticaloa is a Portuguese derivation. The original name of the region being the Tamil "Matakkalappu" (translation: Muddy Swamp). According to Mattakallappu Manmiyam (மட்டக்களப்பு மான்மியம்) the word Mattakkallpu consists Tamil words "Mattu" (மட்டு) Matta-derived from "Mattam" (மட்டம்) means 'flat' and geographical name KaLappu. Mukkuwa named this place as KaLappu-Mattam or boundary of lagoon later it became Matta-Kallappu or Flat Lagoon. Also, Batticaloa has a nickname, "Land of the singing fish" due to musical sounds that related to fish or aquatic creature in the Batticaloa Lagoon near the Kallady Bridge. BBC Radio 4 was able to record the mysterious sound in Batticaloa Lagoon. The sound was broadcast by Sri Lanka Broadcasting Corporation in 1960s with the help of Rev. Fr. Lang, a Catholic priest.

Geography 
Batticaloa is in the eastern coast of Sri Lanka on a flat coastal plain boarded by the Indian Ocean in the east occupies a central part of the eastern Sri Lanka. Batticaloa district has three lagoons such as Batticaloa Lagoon, Valaichchenai Lagoon, and Vakari (Panichchankerni) Lagoon.

There are several islands within the Batticaloa Lagoon such as Puliayantheevu, Buffaloa Island and Bone Island.
Many bridges are built across the lagoon connecting the landmasses and the islands. The Puliayantheevu is the metropolitan place of the city.
The biggest bridge of all is Lady Manning bridge located at Kallady, which is the main access path to the city from the southern places of the district. This bridge is also famous for Singing fishes which were considered as musical sounds heard in the Kallady lagoon on a full moon day. A priest named Father Lang recorded this musical charm and broadcast it in the 1960s over the (Sri Lanka Broadcasting Cooperation)

Batticaloa beaches are sandy and located along  shoreline in the city and further extend through the neighboring places. They include Kallady beach, Pasikudah, and Kalkudah. Pasikudah is a bay protected from the ocean, with a flat and sandy bed extending  meters from the shore.

Climate 
Batticaloa has a tropical wet and dry climate under the Köppen climate classification, also generically referred to as 'dry-monsoonal climate'. Batticaloa's climate is temperate throughout the year. From March to May, the warmest time of the year, the maximum temperature averages around 32 degrees Celsius (88 degrees Fahrenheit).

History

Early history 

Mattakallappu Manmiyam refers (மட்டக்களப்பு மான்மியம்) Mukkuva or Mutkuhar are known as the first people migrated to this land and constructed seven villages in various areas. They immigrated their people from India and established the kingdom of Mukkuva. The name of the villages and towns in Batticaloa still holds the historical evidence of the ancient batticaloan people. When Mutkuhar intruded through the salty water and reached the destination of their voyage at the forests situated around the lagoon. When they finished. The name given by the Mukkuva was "Kallpu-Mattam" which literally means "boundary of lagoon". Later it was called "Matta-Kallappu" which indicates the destination of Mukkuva's voyage and the water is flat.

Mukkuva wars 

Mukkuva is a coastal community from Ancient Tamil country. They are of mixed origin and migrated at various periods in history. Mukkuvas waged war around Puttalam and settled in the western coast as well. Sinhala Kings of Suryawamsa kept Mukkuvas as their mercenary force. They waged wars on other countries like Burma. Gajabahu, Parakramabahu, Vijayabahu were some of these Suryawamsa kings who employed the Chera soldiers for their protection and defence of Sri Lanka. Gajabahu I was a friend of Cheran Chenkuttuvan and was mentioned in the great Jain epic of Silappadikaram and in addition to that he was also mentioned in Mahawamsa.

When Anuradhapura was destroyed, the capital moved from Anuradhapura to Polonnaruwa. When Pollonaruwa was destroyed the capital moved to Kotte and then to Kandy. Anuradhapura was destroyed by Rajaraja Cholan and he who established Polonnaruwa. Even though Pollonaruwa had a few Hindu temples it was a great Buddhist city full of beautiful Buddhist architecture matching Angkor Wat.

Kalinga Magha 

As a catalyst for change, Kalinga Magha is arguably one of the most significant rulers in Sri Lankan history. His invasion marks the final – cataclysmic – destruction of the kingdom of Rajarata, which had for so long been the heart of native power on the island. The great cities of the ancient kings were now lost and disappeared into the jungle, and were not rediscovered until the 19th century. Native power was henceforth centred on a kaleidoscopically shifting collection of kingdoms in south and central Sri Lanka. The north, in the meanwhile, eventually evolved into the Jaffna Kingdom, which was subjected colonial rule by the Portuguese in 1619.

Kalinga Magha's geopolitical impact is reflected in the changing language of the Culavamsa as well. The traditional divisions of Sri Lanka, into Rajarata, Dhakkinadesa, and Ruhuna, first undergo a change of names (Rajarata becomes Pathithadesa, Dhakkinadesa becomes Mayarata), and then slip into obsolescence altogether. Their successor kingdoms tended to be geographically smaller and centred on a strong citadel-capital, such as Yapahuwa or Gampola; they also tended to be much short lived, like Sitawaka.

Jaffna principality 

With the decline of the Rohana sub-kingdom and the defeat of Polonnaruwa, coming with the rise of Chola power, i.e., from about the 13th century CE, these regions became wild. The many irrigation works (tanks etc., which exist even today) became home to malaria (see History of Sri Lanka). In the meantime, the eastern coastal region remained less affected by Malaria and began to be occupied. Thus seafaring people who had begun to settle down along
the coast since the Anuradhapura times, c. 6th Century CE began to flourish. The forests continued to be dominated by the Veddha population which claimed kingship ("cross-cousins") with the Sinhala kings of Kandy.

Parakramabahu II's coronation took place in 1236. He turned his attention to the recovery of Polonnaruwa from the Tamils, and achieved this purpose by 1244. In this connection two kings are mentioned, Kalinga Magha and Jaya Bahu, who had been in power forty years, apparently reckoned from the time of the military rule after Sahasa Malla. As the Tamil war' and the `Malala war' as specifically mentioned by contemporary chronicles the two kings may have held different parts of the country. In the king's eleventh year (1244/5) Lanka was invaded by Chandrabhanu, a Javanese (Javaka) from Tambralinga, with a host armed with blow-pipes and poisoned arrows: he may have been a sea-robber, and though now repulsed descended on the Island later on.

The rest of the reign according to the contemporary records was spent in pious works; the king also held a convocation for the purpose of reforming the priesthood, whose discipline had been relaxed during the Tamil occupation. The chronicles make no mention of a great Pandyan invasion which seems to have taken place between 1254 and 1256, in which one of the kings of Lanka was slain and the other rendered tributary. From this it is clear that Parakramabahu II never had recovered the north of the Island, which certainly had been held by his great namesake.

European colony 

Portugal

Lourenço de Almeida, the Portuguese Admiral for India invaded Ceylon and made it a Portuguese colony. Batticaloa was fortified in the 1620s, which was held until 1638, when the Dutch successfully invaded it.

Batticaloa principality 

Lanka was a confederacy of various rulers for a long time and different princes ruled the different provinces and helped each other and plotted against each other. As the Portuguese colonisers were dividing and ruling Kotte, Kandy Kingdom and Jaffna Kingdom had to create a confederacy to fight against Portugal. As a joint strategy they approached the Netherlands to have a global free trade and to get rid of the Portuguese.

From Cape Comorin the Dutch Admiral Joris van Spilbergen steered his course to Point de Galle; but, without landing there or at any of the other places which were strongly fortified by the Portuguese, he sailed round the south coast of the Island and made for Batticaloa, where he anchored on 31 May 1602.

In the meantime he learnt from some Tamils who came on board that there was plenty of pepper and cinnamon to be had, but that it was to be obtained from the chief of the place. These Tamils brought with them a Portuguese interpreter; for Portuguese was the only European
language then heard or spoken in Ceylon, and the natives of the island had no idea that there were other white people who spoke a different language.

The Admiral was taken from Batticaloa to Kandy and was given a liberation hero's welcome as King Rajasinghe seized the opportunity to get rid of the Portuguese, the oppressors who were slowly encroaching the island systematically and promoting subversion against Rajasinghe.

The Batticaloa fort was built by the Portuguese in 1628 and was the first to be captured by the Dutch (18 May 1638). It is one of the most picturesque of the small Dutch fort of Sri Lanka, it's situated in an island, still in good condition.

World War II 

In 1942, during World War II, the aircraft carrier HMS Hermes and escorting destroyer HMAS Vampire were stationed at Trincomalee. Both these ships came under Japanese aerial attack off Batticaloa and were sunk.

2004 tsunami 

The town was also one of the worst hit during the tsunami of December 26, 2004. The water rose up to  within 90 minutes of the beginning of the 2004 Indian Ocean earthquake.

2019 Easter Bombings 

On 21 April 2019 the Zion Church was targeted by militant Islamic suicide bombers. At least 28 people were reported dead.

Modern Batticaloa Town 

The city has four main divisions.
Puliyanthivu: Seat of many government department and offices, schools, banks religious places, General Hospital, Weber Stadium and Shops. It was a place for NGO offices including ICRC, UN, UNICEF, World Vision, etc.
Koddamunai: Schools, Banks, Sri Lanka Telecom regional office for East, Shops and many government offices are located. Two bridges called Perya Palam and Puthuppalam are connects Pulianthivu island with Koddaminai land mass.
Kallady: Here there are many Government buildings and private industries, schools, hospitals and Eastern University Medical Faculty. Kallady Lady Manning bridge connects Kallady and Arasay.
Puthur: This is where the domestic airport of Batticaloa is located.

Demography 
Batticaloa is on the East coast of Sri Lanka, 314 km from Colombo. The population of 95,489 consists mainly of Sri Lankan Tamils others include Moors, Sinhalese, Burghers and the indigenous Veddas population.

The District of Batticaloa itself consists of several administrative divisions, which are: Manmunai North, Manmunai West, Manmunai South & Eruvil Pattu, Manmunai Pattu, Koralai Pattu North, Porativu Pattu, Kattankudy, Eravur Pattu, Eravur Town, Koralai Pattu and Koralai Pattu West. Some 525,142 persons (52.2% female) were recorded in the 2012 census. Religion-based statistics in the year 2012 are: Hindus 64.6%, Muslims 25.5%, Christians 8.8%, with a small numbers of Buddhists (1.1%) and others. These figures became even more polarized towards Hindus during the LTTE occupation which came to an end in 2009 (see Eelam War IV).

According to the 2012 census, the total population was 525,142. Of which 381,285 were Sri Lankan Tamils, 133,844 Moors, 6,127 were Sinhalese, 2,794 Burgher, 1,015 Indian Tamils, 58 Veddah, 16 Malay, and 3 Sri Lanka Chetty.

Educational institutions 

The first educational institution established in Batticaloa was Methodist Central College, founded in 1814 by the Weslyan Methodist William Ault. Other noteworthy institutions are Sivananda Vidyalayam, Hindu College, St. Michael's College National School, St. Cecilia's Girls' College and Vincent Girls' High School,.
The Eastern University, Sri Lanka (EUSL), located in Vantharumoolai 16 km north of Batticaloa, was founded in 1980. Its development has been interrupted by the civil war. It is the cultural and economic focal point of the district of Batticaloa and extends its influence towards Trincomalee as well. Batticaloa Regional centre of Open University of Sri Lanka is another education resource of Batticaloa.

Cultural institutions 
Batticaloa has historically been a centre of Portuguese Burgher culture, supported in the modern era by the Catholic Burgher Union. In the 1980s, despite Burger emigration to Australia, the Union still numbered some 2,000 speakers of Sri Lankan Portuguese, making them the largest community still speaking the dialect.

Religious institutions 

Hinduism is the major religion of Batticaloa. Eastern Province is a place of Amman temples. This shows the worship of female deity Kannaki of Silappatikaram. The cult has come with the King Gajabahu I who brought the settler Tamils from the Chera Kingdom of his friend Cheran Senguttuvan. Silppatikaram copy was initially discovered in Trincomalee by Tamil scholars. Tamil Nadu was not having a copy of this great Tamil literature. The northern and eastern parts of Sri Lanka have several temples in honour of Kannaki Amman. Gajabahu I brought Amman worship to Sri Lanka in the Third Century AD after her death.

Shri Mamangeshwarar Kovil is one of the main holy places for Hindus in the country is located in a place called Amirthakally which is 6 Kilometers away from Batticaloa town. Hindus believe that by bathing in the sacred waters of the Mamangeshwarar tank, the departed souls of their family will be receiving better attainments in their cycle of its transmigration. Sri Kandaswamy/KannakaiAmman Kovil are important from a devotional point of view. The Mandur (மண்டூர்) temple is in the southern end, while the Mamangeshwarar temple is in the westernmost edge at Muhaththuvaram (முகத்துவாரம்).

The Colany Mosque, and the Koddamunai Dharga and Madrasa are two noteworthy Muslim institutions. There are a large number of mosques in the region.

Christianity is present and Catholic churches are found everywhere as the coastal community has some Catholics. During the colonial influences, Catholic was introduced to Batticaloan, and the first Catholic church in Batticaloa was established in 1624. The Catholic Church has a diocese headquartered in the city. Methodists, Anglicans, and other Protestants and their schools are also present in Batticaloa. Within Batticaloa Municipal Council area, Christian presence is strong (23%) compare to other area.

The latter is a historic harbour and ancient Buddhist shrine, mentioned in the "Dhathu Vamsa". While the Dagaba and shrine in the Dutch Fort is the oldest (1st century CE), Mangalaramaya is a well-known modern Buddhist temple in Batticaloa.

Economic activities 
Rice and coconuts are the two staples of the district, and steamers trading round the island call regularly at the port. The lagoon is famous for its "singing fish," supposed to be shell-fish which give forth musical notes. The district has a remnant of Veddahs or wild men of the wood. Prior to the Sri Lankan civil war, there were large-scale shrimp farms as well as fish and rice processing activities. Batticaloa shows a huge potential for tourism related industries.

Transport 

Batticaloa is the terminus of a Broad gauge branch railway of the Sri Lanka Railways network. The Batticaloa railway station is the last station on Batticaloa Line. Batticaloa Airport is a military air force base, which has domestic air service to civilian as well by Cinnamon Air and Helitours. Bus service is available to major cities of Sri Lanka.

See also 
 Batticaloa Tamil dialect
 List of cities in Sri Lanka
 Portuguese Burghers
 Vellaveli Brahmi Inscription

References

External links 

Batticaloa Municipal Council 
Batticaloa  
Batticaloa Diocese

 
 Cities in Sri Lanka
 Populated places in Batticaloa District
 Manmunai North DS Division
 Kingdom of Kandy